Rocksteady is a musical genre, a predecessor of reggae, that was most popular in Jamaica in the 1960s.

Rocksteady or Rock Steady may also refer to:

Music

Albums
 Rock Steady (album), or the title song, by No Doubt, 2001
 Rock Steady with Flo & Eddie, by Flo & Eddie, 1981
 Rocksteady (Big Head Todd and the Monsters album), or the title song, 2010

Songs
 "Rock Steady" (All Saints song), 2006
 "Rock Steady" (Aretha Franklin song), 1971
 "Rock Steady" (Bonnie Raitt and Bryan Adams song), 1995
 "Rock Steady" (The Whispers song), 1987
 "Rock Steady", by Alton Ellis
 "Rock Steady", by Bad Company from Bad Company
 "Rocksteady", by The Bloody Beetroots
 "Rocksteady", by Marc Broussard from Carencro
 "Rock Steady", by Namie Amuro from 60s 70s 80s
 "Rocksteady", by Remy Shand from The Way I Feel
 "Rock Steady", by Sting from ...Nothing Like the Sun
 "Rock Steady (I'm Rough and Ready)", by Steppenwolf from Rock & Roll Rebels
 "Rock Steady, Pt. 2", by Pete Rock from Soul Survivor

Other uses
 Rocksteady Studios, a British video game developer
 Rock Steady Group, a British event security company based in Edinburgh
 Rock Steady (film), a 2002 film starring Victor Rasuk
 Rocksteady, a character from Teenage Mutant Ninja Turtles; see Bebop and Rocksteady

See also
 Rocksteddy, a Filipino alternative rock band